The given name Rebel may refer to:

Rebel A. Cole, American professor
Rebel Penfold-Russell, Australian film producer and occasional actress
Rebel Randall (1922–2010), American film actress and radio personality
Rebel Rodriguez (born 1999), American actor and son of director Robert Rodriguez
Rebel Steiner, defensive back in the National Football League
Rebel Wilson (born 1980), Australian actress, writer, and stand-up comedian

See also
Rebel (surname)

English-language unisex given names